Waukee Community School District (WCSD) is a public school district headquartered in Waukee, Iowa. Entirely in Dallas County, it serves Waukee and portions of Clive, Urbandale and West Des Moines.

As of 2015 it is the fastest growing school district in the state. The district has more than 8,000 students from preschool through twelfth grade and more than 1,200 staff members. Students residing outside the district open enrollment have the option of open enrollment.

History

The district previously had a Native American logo but discontinued use of it in 1998. It did not have a logo since then and instead used a "W". When the University of Wisconsin-Madison told the district that its logo was too similar to its own, the district modified the design of the "W". In 2016 it adopted a Spartan-style warrior as its mascot.

From 2004 to 2015 enrollment increased by 470 students annually. The district's eighth elementary school was to open in fall 2016, and accordingly it made a plan to modify its attendance boundaries across the board.

The district established a second high school in 2021, Waukee Northwest High School.  A third high school will likely be added in the 2030s or 40s.

Schools

Elementary schools:
 Brookview
 Eason
 Grant Ragan
 Maple Grove
 Radiant
 It was scheduled to open in 2019 and was the ninth elementary school opened by the district.
 Shuler
 Walnut Hills
 Waukee
 Woodland Hills
 Sugar Creek
Opening Fall 2022

Middle schools:
 Waukee Middle School
 South Middle School

Grade 8-9 schools:
 Timberline School
 Opened 2015 
 Prairieview School

High schools:
 Waukee High School
 Waukee Northwest High School

Enrollment
Waukee is one of the fastest growing districts in the state of Iowa, and has seen dramatic growth since 2000.

See also
List of school districts in Iowa

References

External links
 Waukee Community School District

School districts in Iowa
Education in Dallas County, Iowa
Urbandale, Iowa
West Des Moines, Iowa